Igor Arhirii (born 17 February 1997) is a Moldovan professional footballer who plays as a defender for Romanian Liga II side CSC 1599 Șelimbăr and the Moldova national team.

Club career
Arhirii made his professional debut for Zimbru in the Divizia Națională on 25 September 2016 against Ungheni.

International career
He made his debut for Moldova national football team on 28 March 2021 in a World Cup qualifier against Denmark, which Moldova lost 0–8.

References

External links

1997 births
People from Cimișlia District
Living people
Moldovan footballers
Association football defenders
Moldova youth international footballers
Moldova international footballers
Moldovan Super Liga players
FC Zimbru Chișinău players
FC Milsami Orhei players
Liga II players
CSC 1599 Șelimbăr players
Moldovan expatriate footballers
Moldovan expatriate sportspeople in Romania
Expatriate footballers in Romania